Moths of Mali represent only 23 known moth species. The moths (mostly nocturnal) and butterflies (mostly diurnal) together make up the taxonomic order Lepidoptera.

This is a list of moth species which have been recorded in Mali.

Arctiidae
Alpenus maculosa (Stoll, 1781)
Amerila niveivitrea (Bartel, 1903)

Geometridae
Zamarada nasuta Warren, 1897

Lasiocampidae
Cleopatrina bilinea (Walker, 1855)
Lasiocampa bilineata (Mabille, 1884)
Pallastica lateritia (Hering, 1928)
Streblote panda Hübner, 1822

Noctuidae
Abrostola confusa Dufay, 1958
Acontia basifera Walker, 1857
Acontia buchanani (Rothschild, 1921)
Acontia citrelinea Bethune-Baker, 1911
Acontia opalinoides Guenée, 1852
Acontia semialba Hampson, 1910
Heliocheilus confertissima (Walker, 1865)
Hypena obacerralis Walker, [1859]
Hypotacha isthmigera Wiltshire, 1968
Spodoptera exempta (Walker, 1857)

Psychidae
Acanthopsyche carbonarius Karsch, 1900

Pterophoridae
Hepalastis pumilio (Zeller, 1873)

Pyraloidea
Analyta calligrammalis Mabille, 1879
Ancylolomia simplella de Joannis, 1913
Autocharis marginata Guillermet, 1996
Biafra concinnella (Ragonot, 1888)
Botyodes asialis Guenée, 1854
Botyodes diniasalis (Walker, 1859)
Diaphania indica (Saunders, 1851)
Euclasta warreni Distant, 1892
Ghesquierellana hirtusalis (Walker, 1859)
Glyphodes bitriangulalis Gaede, 1917
Glyphodes negatalis (Walker, 1859)
Haritalodes derogata (Fabricius, 1775)
Herpetogramma basalis (Walker, 1866)
Hypsopygia bamakoensis Leraut, 2006
Maliarpha separatella Ragonot, 1888
Maruca vitrata (Fabricius, 1787)
Palpita vitrealis (Rossi, 1794)
Parapoynx fluctuosalis (Zeller, 1852)
Pardomima callixantha Martin, 1955
Parotis impia (Meyrick, 1934)
Patania balteata (Fabricius, 1798)
Pioneabathra olesialis (Walker, 1859)
Pyralis pictalis (Curtis, 1834)
Pyrausta phoenicealis (Hübner, 1818)
Sameodes cancellalis (Zeller, 1852)
Spoladea recurvalis (Fabricius, 1775)
Syllepte ovialis (Walker, 1859)
Synclera traducalis (Zeller, 1852)
Terastia africana Sourakov, 2015
Ulopeza conigeralis Zeller, 1852
Ulopeza flavicepsalis Hampson, 1912

Tineidae
Cimitra fetialis (Meyrick, 1917)
Endromarmata lutipalpis (Meyrick, 1922)
Hyperbola pastoralis (Meyrick, 1931)

Tortricidae
Cosmorrhyncha acrocosma (Meyrick, 1908)

References 

 Poltavsky, A.N., Kravchenko, V.D., Traore, M.M., Traore, S.F., Gergely, P., Witt, Th.J., Sulak, H., Beck, R.H.-T., Junnila, A., Revay, E.E., Doumbia, S., Beier, J.C. & Müller, G.C. 2018. Biodiversity and seasonality of Pyraloidea (Lepidoptera) in the woody savannah belt in Mali. Israel Journal of Entomology 48 (1): 69–78. Article

External links 
 AfroMoths

Moths
Moths
Mali
Mali